The 2018 Pinstripe Bowl was a college football bowl game played on December 27, 2018. It was the ninth edition of the Pinstripe Bowl, and one of the 2018–19 bowl games concluding the 2018 FBS football season. Sponsored by the New Era Cap Company, the game was officially known as the New Era Pinstripe Bowl. The game was a rematch of the 2017 Orange Bowl, won by Wisconsin, 34–24.

Teams
The game was played between teams from the Atlantic Coast Conference (ACC) and the Big Ten Conference.

Miami Hurricanes

Miami received and accepted a bid to the Pinstripe Bowl on December 2. The Hurricanes entered the bowl with a 7–5 record (4–4 in conference). This was the second time Miami has played in a New York City bowl game, with their first visit (also in Yankee Stadium) resulting in a 34–36 loss to Nebraska in the 1962 Gotham Bowl.

On December 26, senior Malik Rosier was named Miami's starting quarterback over redshirt freshman  N'Kosi Perry. Head coach Mark Richt made it clear that Perry was not suspended and that he was available to play "as of right now" in response to questions by the media regarding his eligibility as a result of sexually explicit videos posted to Perry's social media accounts. In the game, Rosier was 5-for-12 passing (with three interceptions) and gained 90 yards rushing, while Perry was 1-for-5 passing (with one interception) and 11 yards rushing.

Wisconsin Badgers

Wisconsin received and accepted a bid to the Pinstripe Bowl on December 2. The Badgers entered the bowl with a 7–5 record (5–4 in conference).

Game summary

Scoring summary

Statistics

References

External links

Box score at ESPN

Pinstripe Bowl
Pinstripe Bowl
Miami Hurricanes football bowl games
Wisconsin Badgers football bowl games
Pinstripe Bowl
Pinstripe Bowl
2010s in the Bronx